"Pinky Santa" is the fourth Japanese single by South Korean boy band  Boyfriend from their 4th Japanese single album of the same name which features Japanese actor and actress Taishi Nakagawa and Aoi Yoshikura as its PV models. This single is an original song and was released physically on November 20, 2013.

Background and promotion 
On October 23, 2013, Boyfriend revealed the preview for their Christmas song "Pinky Santa". The single is entitled 'Pinky Santa' which obviously utilizes color pink, but pinky also means the smallest finger which is used when promising. Boyfriend released the single on November 20, 2013 in four different versions: (limited edition B version A with cd, version b with cd and DVD, and normal edition).

Track listing

Music videos

Charts

Oricon

Other Charts

References 

2013 singles
Japanese-language songs
2013 songs
Starship Entertainment singles